Yuriy Natarov (born 28 December 1996) is a Kazakh cyclist, who currently rides for UCI WorldTeam .

Major results

2014
 1st  Time trial, National Junior Road Championships
2016
 1st  Time trial, National Under-23 Road Championships
2017
 2nd GP Capodarco
 3rd  Time trial, Asian Under-23 Road Championships
 10th Overall Tour of Almaty
2018
 10th Overall Giro Ciclistico d'Italia
2019
 1st  Overall Tour of Almaty
2021
 3rd Time trial, National Road Championships
2022
 1st  Team time trial, Asian Road Championships
 1st  Time trial, National Road Championships

Grand Tour general classification results timeline

References

External links

1996 births
Living people
Kazakhstani male cyclists
People from Almaty Region
Kazakhstani people of Russian descent
20th-century Kazakhstani people
21st-century Kazakhstani people